Christine Erbe is a German-Australian physicist specializing in underwater acoustics. She is a professor in the School of Earth and Planetary Sciences and director of the Centre for Marine Science and Technology (CMST)—both at Curtin University in Perth, Western Australia, Australia. Erbe is known for her research on acoustic masking in marine mammals, investigating how man-made underwater noise interferes with animal acoustic communication.

Early life and education 
Erbe grew up in Herdecke, North Rhine Westphalia, Germany, where she attended the Friedrich Harkort Gymnasium. She studied physics at Technische Universität Dortmund, graduating in 1993. Her Master of Science thesis entitled "Development and Test of Beam Position and Intensity Monitors for the DELTA Linear Electron Accelerator" was undertaken at the Dortmunder Elektronenspeicherring Anlage (DELTA). Erbe joined the Department of Geophysics at the University of British Columbia, Vancouver, British Columbia, Canada as a PhD student, graduating in 1997. She studied underwater noise emission by icebreakers in the Canadian Arctic, the potential interference of this noise with acoustic communication in beluga whales, and the auditory abilities of beluga whales to detect the sounds of conspecifics in ambient Arctic noise. Erbe collaborated with Vancouver Aquarium on behavioural hearing tests, measuring audiograms and masked hearing thresholds in beluga whales. Her Ph.D. thesis entitled "The Masking of Beluga Whale (Delphinapterus leucas) Vocalizations by Icebreaker Noise" was supervised by David M. Farmer, John K. Ford, and Matthew J. Yedlin. Increasingly interested in teaching physics to students at all levels, Erbe further obtained a Graduate Diploma in Education (Senior Years) from Queensland University of Technology, Brisbane, Queensland, Australia.

Career and impact 
Erbe completed a postdoctoral research year in 1999, at the Institute of Ocean Sciences, Fisheries and Oceans Canada, Sidney, British Columbia, Canada, studying industrial noise in the oceans and its effects on marine mammals. One particular investigation focused on underwater noise from whale-watching boats impacting southern resident killer whales.

Recognizing the need for science transfer to industry, Erbe spent several years as a private consultant in underwater noise working for offshore oil and gas companies, the maritime defense industry, and government departments tasked with regulating underwater noise. She joined JASCO Applied Sciences as director of their Australian office, Brisbane, Queensland, Australia in 2006.

In 2011, Erbe returned to academia as director of CMST, an external collaborative research center of Curtin University. In this role, Erbe is responsible for the center's research, development, and consulting activities; building strategic partnerships with industry and government; and supervising higher-degree-by-research students. Under her leadership, CMST specializes in underwater acoustics, sound measurement and modelling, marine soundscapes, passive acoustic monitoring of marine fauna and human activities, and the effects of underwater noise. CMST works closely with offshore industries, maritime defense, and government.

Erbe's research is increasingly featured in the media; e.g., her work on underwater sounds emitted by recreational swimmers, kayakers, and scuba divers, the first description of the sounds of southern pilot whales including mimicry of killer whale calls, and why healthy oceans need to be quieter. She has also participated in educational media programs.

Erbe chaired the Animal Bioacoustics Technical Committee of the Acoustical Society of America (2015–2018). She served on the awards committee for the Herman Medwin Prize in Acoustical Oceanography (2016–2018). She chaired the international conference series on The Effects of Noise on Aquatic Life (2014–2019). She was a member of the steering committee for an International Quiet Ocean Experiment (2010–2013). She participated in the International Organization for Standardization (ISO) Technical Committee 43, Sub-Committee 1, Working Group 55 on standardizing underwater noise measurements of vessels (2010–2016). She served on the Commission of Independent Scientific Experts (Kommission unabhängiger wissenschaftlicher Sachverständiger), Bundesministerium für Umwelt, Naturschutz und nukleare Sicherheit, Germany, advising on underwater noise in the Southern Ocean (2015–2021).

Awards and honors 
Erbe was elected Fellow of the Acoustical Society of America in 2016.

Selected works

References

External links 
 Christine Erbe at Curtin University

It's time to speak up about noise pollution in the oceans. The Conversation, Sept. 2016

Year of birth missing (living people)
Living people
Fellows of the Acoustical Society of America
German women physicists
Australian women physicists
German expatriates in Australia
People from Herdecke
21st-century Australian physicists
21st-century German physicists
21st-century German women scientists
Technische Universität Darmstadt alumni
University of British Columbia alumni
Queensland University of Technology alumni